Focusrite PLC is an English music and audio products group based in High Wycombe, England (with its history in Focusrite Audio Engineering Ltd.). The Focusrite Group trades under eight brands: Focusrite, Focusrite Pro, Martin Audio, ADAM Audio, Novation, Ampify Music, Optimal Audio and Sequential. Focusrite designs and markets audio interfaces, microphone preamps, consoles, analogue equalizers (EQ) and channel strips, and digital audio processing hardware and software for professional and home studios. 

Focusrite has been the recipient of four Queen's Awards for Enterprise, two for International Trade and two for Technology.

History
Founded in 1985 by Rupert Neve, Focusrite's first contracts included a commission from George Martin to build extensions to AIR Studios' custom Neve consoles, initially the vintage recording console in Martin's AIR Montserrat studio in the Caribbean – specifically a  microphone preamplifier and equaliser.

Audio industry entrepreneur and co-founder of Soundcraft Electronics Ltd, Phil Dudderidge purchased the company's assets in April 1989, establishing Focusrite Audio Engineering Ltd and reissuing the original modules along with some new designs. The company also designed a new console, the Focusrite Studio Console, released in 1990.

In August 2004, Focusrite acquired electronic instrument manufacturer Novation which became a subsidiary called Novation Digital Music Systems Ltd.

On 12 December 2014, Focusrite was floated on the AIM market as Focusrite plc.

In July 2019, Focusrite acquired monitor speaker manufacturer ADAM Audio, and in December 2019 acquired Martin Audio who manufacture loudspeaker systems for sound reinforcement.

In April 2021, Focusrite acquired Sequential, a designer of analogue synthesizers.

In March 2022, Focusrite acquired the UK audio equipment maker Linea Research Holdings for £12.6 million.

References

External links 
 The official Focusrite website

Audio mixing console manufacturers
Audio equipment manufacturers of the United Kingdom
British brands
Manufacturing companies established in 1985
Electronics companies established in 1985
British companies established in 1985
1989 mergers and acquisitions
2004 mergers and acquisitions
2014 initial public offerings
2019 mergers and acquisitions
2021 mergers and acquisitions
2022 mergers and acquisitions